William Paul Joseph Haynes (March 1, 1909 in Montreal, Quebec – May 12, 1989) was a Canadian ice hockey forward. He played in the National Hockey League for the Montreal Maroons, Boston Bruins, and Montreal Canadiens between 1930 and 1941.

Career
Haynes started his National Hockey League career with the Montreal Maroons. He would also play with the Boston Bruins and Montreal Canadiens. His career lasted from 1931 to 1941. He discovered future stars Elmer Lach and Ken Reardon for the Canadiens after getting injured and being sent on a scouting tour of the West. His career ended when he was cut by Canadiens coach Dick Irvin for skipping practice in New York to attend the opera.

Career statistics

Regular season and playoffs

External links

References 

1909 births
1989 deaths
Boston Bruins players
Canadian ice hockey centres
Ice hockey people from Montreal
Montreal Canadiens players
Montreal Maroons players
New Haven Eagles players
Windsor Bulldogs (1929–1936) players